Pachka sigaret  is a song by the Soviet post-punk band Kino from the album Star Called Sun released in 1988. One of Kino's most popular songs. It was written in 1988, when Viktor Tsoi was filmed in the Needle.

It was originally planned that the new album would be called "Pachka Sigaret" because of this song, but the renaming happened after Tsoi decided to introduce "Zvezda po imeni Solntse" on the last day of recording.

In the 21st century, a number of musicians and bands such as Sergey Shnurov and Vopli Vidoplyasova offered the audience their cover versions of this song.

Background 

According to director Sergei Lysenko the idea for the song "Pachka Sigaret" came from Viktor Tsoi in 1986 when the members of Kino were filming in the short film Konets Kanikul. This film did not become a significant event either in Soviet cinema or in Tsoi's creative biography, however, the atmosphere that developed in the film band was close to the mood of the future song. As Lysenko and Kyiv actor Aleksey Kovzhun recalled one night after sitting up talking the musicians found that they had run out of cigarettes. Since shops with a round-the-clock work schedule did not exist in the USSR, several people, including Tsoi, went out into the street to "shoot smoke from passers-by." In a conditional competition - "who shoots more" - the leader of the Kino group won.

The song itself was written two years later in Alma-Ata, where Tsoi starred in another film - The Needle by Rashid Nugmanov. Judging by the surviving draft, the original version of the text was somewhat different from the final version recorded in the albumZvezda po imeni Solntse. In the author's notepad manuscript, the first line was shorter: "I [sit and] look at someone else's sky from someone else's window." In addition, some auxiliary words were missing which later determined the rhythm of the composition. As Yuri Kasparyan, who arranged the song, said, her melody "was built purely mathematically" and therefore he selected the notes, guided by his own idea of their appropriateness: "I just like harmony, algebra - it's all very interesting."

The fact that the theme laid down in the song was close to Tsoi and his friends was also recalled by the first director of Kino Yuri Belishkin - according to the producer he first came to meet the musicians (who in the late 1980s worked, as a rule in the Leningrad apartment of the band's drummer Georgy Guryanov on Budapeshtskaya Street) he drew attention to the unpretentiousness of the situation: “A table, cigarettes and tea. They sat, were silent, smoked, played something on the guitars". It was in Guryanov's apartment that the experimental versions of the compositions included in the new rock cycle were recorded, which for a long time had the working title Pachka Sigaret. The renaming took place at the end of 1988 at the initiative of Tsoi, who announced that he had decided to add the song "Zvezda po imeni Solntse" already recorded for the film Needle and it would give the name to the album.

Composition 

The main features of the lyrical hero Tsoi were determined long before the release of the song. In 1985 the magazine Roxy, created on the basis of the Leningrad Rock Club, wrote that listeners know "almost everything" about the life of Tsoi's character: "He constantly smokes both cigarettes. He likes to walk at night, yearns for the Black Sea, does not really trust the train."As the hero grows older, he gains new life experience, and if in the album Gruppa krovi he realizes himself as a fighter in some existential war" then in the next rock cycle Zvezda po imeni Solntse the character already feels tired from the confrontation with the world: "I walked all the roads and back and forth, / Turned around and could not see the traces".

Personnel 

 Viktor Tsoi — vocals, rhythm guitar
 Yuri Kasparyan — lead guitar, keyboard
 Игорь Тихомиров — bass guitar
 Georgy Guryanov — drum machine Yamaha RX-5

References 

 
 
 
 
 
 

1988 songs
Soviet songs
Kino (band) songs